The avian family Laridae comprise the noddies, skimmers, kittiwakes, gulls, and terns. The International Ornithological Committee (IOC) recognizes these 103 Laridae species distributed among 22 genera.

This list is presented according to the IOC taxonomic sequence and can also be sorted alphabetically by common name and binomial.

References

 
Laridae